Margaret Greville, 6th Baroness Willoughby de Broke and de jure 14th Baroness Latimer (c. 1561 – 26 March 1631) was a peeress in the peerage of England.

Margaret Greville was born circa 1561, the youngest daughter of Sir Fulke Greville, Sheriff of Warwick and 4th Baron Willoughby de Broke (1536–1606) and Lady Ann Neville. She married on 29 October 1582 at Alcester Sir Richard Verney (d. 1630). She inherited de jure the title 6th Baroness Willoughby de Broke and 14th Baroness Latimer when her brother Sir Fulke Greville, 1st Baron Brooke and 5th Baron Willoughby de Broke (1554–1628) was murdered by one of his servants. Her brother's senior title of Baron Brooke had been passed on to a cousin who her brother had formally adopted.

On her death on 26 March 1631, her title passed to her son, Greville Verney.

References

 
 Thepeerage

External links
 Compton Verney House website

1560s births
1631 deaths
Margaret
16th-century English nobility
16th-century  English women
17th-century English nobility
17th-century English women
English baronesses
Margaret
6